The genus Platanthera belongs to the subfamily Orchidoideae of the family Orchidaceae, and comprises about 150 species of orchids.  The members of this genus, known as the butterfly orchids or fringed orchids, were previously included in the genus Orchis, which is a close relative (along with the genus Habenaria). They are distributed throughout the temperate regions of the Northern Hemisphere. They are terrestrial and have tubercules.

Etymology 
Louis Claude Richard chose the name Platanthera for this genus; it comes from the Greek and means "broad or wide anther," referring to the separation of the base of the pollinia in the type species of the genus.  Richard felt that this characteristic distinguished the genus Platanthera from both the genus Orchis and the genus Habenaria.  However, today the defining characteristics of the genus are generally accepted to be the absence of both stigmatic processes (typical in Habenaria) and ovoid root-tuberoids (characteristic of both Habenaria and Orchis). Still, P. nivea, P. clavellata and P. integra all have stigmatic processes, showing the limitations of morphological characteristics in defining this clade.

Description and habitat 
Species of Platanthera are perennial terrestrial herbs, erect in habit. The roots are fasciculate and typically fleshy and slender, although they may be somewhat tuberous; if tuberous they are lanceolate to fusiform and not ovoid. The leaves are generally fleshy and range from oblong or ovoid to lanceolate. Leaf shape often varies with the lower leaves more ovoid in shape, progressively becoming more lanceolate as they progress up the scape; floral bracts, if present, are lanceolate to linear. The base of the leaves typically sheathes the stem. The inflorescence is terminal and solitary, and the flowers form a cylindrical spike that ranges from sparse to dense. The flowers are typically resupinate, and often showy and colorful. Petal colors range from purple, orange and yellow to green and white. The petals and labellum are typically entire, but in a number of North American species they may be fringed or edentate; in this group of species the labellum is also often deeply lobed or auricuate. The seed capsules are cylindrical and ridged.

These terrestrial orchids develop in a wide range of soil types and habitats, from strongly basic soils to deeply acidic bog soils, from forest openings and in clearings within the forest to open tundra and various wetland habitats. 

Some Platanthera species are pollinated by mosquitoes.

Species 
Many species can cross-fertilise, resulting in great morphological variety and complicating classification.

The type species is Platanthera bifolia. More than 400 species, subspecies, and varieties have been described, and a 1997 study estimated around 85 species were clearly defined, though these quantities vary considerably between evolving classification systems, and naturally change as specimens are reanalyzed or newly acquired. "Species of Platanthera occur in North America, Asia, Europe, North Africa, Borneo, and Sarawak. Major
centers of diversity are found in North America and East Asia."

The Plant List which tracks botanical names lists 152 accepted species names in the genus Platanthera as of 2022, along with 100ds of infraspecific names.

They include:

Species endemic to North America

Other species native to North America

Other species native to Asia

Other species

Further reading
 Leroy-Terquem, Gerald and Jean Parisot. Orchids: Care and Cultivation. London: Cassel Publishers Ltd., 1991.
 Schoser, Gustav.  Orchid Growing Basics.  New York: Sterling Publishing Co., Inc., 1993.
 White, Judy. Taylor’s Guide to Orchids. Frances Tenenbaum, Series Editor.  New York: Houghton-Mifflin, 1996.
 The Illustrated Encyclopedia of Orchids by Alec Pridgeon. Published by the Timber Press.
 The Manual Of Cultivated Orchid Species By Bechtel, Cribb and Launert, Published by The MIT Press.

References

External links 

Platanthera Interactive Key at Utah State University
Platanthera Fact Sheets
Platanthera Interactive Key from Orchids of Wisconsin online Flora
Platanthera picture database

 
Orchideae genera